is a Japanese voice actor from Tokyo who works for Aoni Production. Egawa is most known for the roles of Shin'ichi Maki in Slam Dunk, Geki Kuroiwa in Brave Command Dagwon, Geki Hyūma and Goldymarg in The King of Braves GaoGaiGar, Ogremon and Mugendramon in Digimon Adventure, Killer Bee in Naruto Shippuden, Falco Lombardi in the Star Fox series, and Purple Haze in JoJo's Bizarre Adventure: All Star Battle.

In 2016, he became the second voice actor to voice for Keiishin Ukai of Haikyuu!!! after Kazunari Tanaka's death.

Filmography

Television animation
1992
Dragon Ball Z (Aqua, Bora, Gozu, Man in City, Olibu, P.E. Teacher, Papoi, Pirozhki, Spopovitch, Teacher, Torubi)
Sailor Moon (Announcer, Band-Man, Boss Cat, Clerk, Soldier)

1993
Kenyū Densetsu Yaiba (Kagetora, Professor Kanabo)
Ghost Sweeper Mikami (Right Gatekeeper)
Aoki Densetsu Shoot! (Shigeki Otsuka)
 Slam Dunk (Shinichi Maki)
Sailor Moon R (Jakoku, Old Man)

1995
Kuso Kagaku Sekai Gulliver Boy (Maron, Priest, Sensei)
Romeo and the Black Brothers (Boss B)

1996
Jigoku Sensei Nube (Yamagami)
Brave Command Dagwon (Geki Kuroiwa)

1997
The Slayers Try (Kurabos)
Cooking Master Boy (Al)
Chō Mashin Eiyūden Wataru (Rottman)
Pokémon (Construction Director)
GaoGaiGar: King of the Braves (Genki Hyuma, Goldy Marg)
Flame of Recca (Tsumemaru)

1998
Outlaw Star (Kyokan)
Trigun (Gunman A, Man A, Marvin)
Master Keaton (Truck Driver)
Yu-Gi-Oh! (Headman, Red)
Record of Lodoss War: Chronicles of the Heroic Knight (Rabid)

1999
Kindaichi Shounen no Jikenbo (Takashi Ishikawa)
The Big O (Waiter)
Turn A Gundam (Daimyo)
Digimon Adventure (Ogremon, Mugendramon)
BuBu ChaCha (Hippo Truck)
Infinite Ryvius (Brian Brab Jr., Fu Namuchia)

2000
Clockwork Fighters Hiwou's War (Ishi)
Hajime no Ippo (Toshiyuki Ohta)
Boogiepop Phantom (Officer Morita)
Mushrambo (Iris)
Detective Conan (Haruyuki Yoshino)
One Piece (Kuroobi)

2001
Inuyasha (Bandit leader, Jinenji)
Geisters: Fractions of the Earth (Urba Shamarel)
Shaman King (Kajimahide, Mosuke)
Zone of the Enders (Bashiriko Basilisk)
Daisuki! BuBu ChaCha (Hippo Truck)
Noir (Paolo)
Detective Conan (Kengo Bito, Osamu Kenzaki)

2002
Overman King Gainer (Yassaba Jin)
Mobile Suit Gundam Seed (Captain Hoffman)
Ultimate Muscle (The Cyborg)
The Twelve Kingdoms (Goson)
Tenshi na Konamaiki (Goshima)
Heat Guy J (Daqui)
Full Metal Panic! (Koh)

2003
Inuyasha (Ginkotsu, Villager)
Zatch Bell! (Dalmos)
Mermaid Forest (Fisherman)
Texhnolyze (Akihisa Sonoda)
Bōken Yūki Pluster World (Zanagul)
Bobobo-bo Bo-bobo (Kirariino)

2004
Area 88 (Captain Shibukawa)
Kinnikuman Nisei - Ultimate Muscle (Blocks, Legocs)
Samurai Gun (Lord Kozan)
Samurai Champloo (Habu)
Naruto (Fukusuke Hikyakuya)
Burst Angel (Eiji)
Phoenix (Getsudan)
Black Jack (Azizi, Delinquent A)
Bleach (Bulbous G, Danzomaru, Shrieker)
BECK: Mongolian Chop Squad (Micchan)
Detective Conan (Naokazu Fukuchi, Keiji Hotta)
Paranoia Agent (Yoshihiro Wanibuchi)
Ragnarok The Animation (Holgren)

2005
Aria the Animation (Akatsuki's Brother)
The Law of Ueki (Sakura Suzuki)
GUNxSWORD (Sheriff, Zanak)
Speed Grapher (Makabe)
Xenosaga: The Animation (Andrew)
Shinshaku Sengoku Eiyū Densetsu - Sanada Jū Yūshi The Animation (Kani Saizo Yoshinaga)
Transformers: Cybertron (Jackshot)
Black Cat (Naizer Bruckheimer)
Brave King GaoGaiGar Final Grand Glorious Gathering (Geki Hyūma)
Rockman EXE Beast (Zoano GutsMan)

2006
Aria The Natural (Akatsuki's Brother)
Gintama (Saigou, Shuwa)
Kekkaishi (Yoki)
Jyu-Oh-Sei (Professor Loki)
Black Blood Brothers (Badrick Serihan)
Black Lagoon (Abrego)
Black Lagoon: The Second Barrage (Abrego, Sahalov)
Detective Conan (Hozumi)
Yu-Gi-Oh! Duel Monsters GX (Male Yubel)
Yume Tsukai (Overseer)

2007
Kishin Taisen Gigantic Formula (Raizo Rakuichi)
Gegege no Kitarō (Tsurube-Otoshi)
Kenichi: The Mightiest Disciple (Bouncer)
Neuro: Supernatural Detective (Souta Tsutsui)
Red Garden (Randy)

2008
Allison & Lillia (Man 1)
Kaiba (Vanilla)
Mobile Suit Gundam 00 Second Season (Arthur Goodman)
Hakaba Kitarō (Chairman)
Antique Bakery (Gymnastics Chairman)
Nabari no Ou (Shiranui)
Persona -trinity soul- (Kunio Itou)

2009
Golgo 13 (Bernard Kelly)
Sōten Kōro (Cao Hong/Sō Kō)

2010
Dragon Ball Kai (Pirozhki)
Naruto Shippūden (Killer Bee)
Pocket Monsters: Best Wishes! (Don George)
Beyblade: Metal Masters (George)
Rainbow - Nisha Rokubō no Shichinin (Igarashi)
Stitch! ~Best Friends Forever~ (Stitch's clone)

2011
Gintama (Saigou Tokumori)
Tamayura - Hitotose (Ichirō)
Toriko (Morijii)
Phi-Brain - Puzzle of God (Cafeteria Oyaji)
Blade (Saragi)
Beyblade: Metal Fury (George)

2012
Mobile Suit Gundam AGE (Zanald Beyhard)
Sket Dance (Daijirō Kutsuwa)
Smile Precure! (Warubuttaa)
Muv-Luv Alternative: Total Eclipse (Kozo Sanada, Teacher)
High School DxD (Zatouji)
Phi-Brain - Puzzle of God: The Orpheus Order (Zatouji)
Btooom! (Yoshihisa Kira)
Persona 4: The Animation (Daidara Shopkeeper)
One Piece Episode of Nami: Kōkaishi no Namida to Nakama no Kizuna (Kuroobi)

2013
Saint Seiya Omega (Eigaion)
Hajime no Ippo Rising (Iwao Shimabukuro)
Hakkenden: Eight Dogs of the East (Kenta's Father)
Pocket Monsters: Best Wishes! Season 2: Decolora Adventure (Don George)

2014
Yona of the Dawn (Yu-Hon)
Rage of Bahamut: Genesis (Garth, Ghos)
The World Is Still Beautiful (Chamberlain B)
Marvel Disk Wars: The Avengers (Nick Fury)
Dragon Ball Kai (Bora, Spopovitch)
Hero Bank (Shishio Torai)
Persona 4 the Golden Animation (Master Daidara)
Momokyun Sword (Tekki)
The Last: Naruto the Movie (Hamura Otsutsuki)

2015
Ushio & Tora (Hitotsuki)
Dragon Ball Super (Pirozhki)

2016
World Trigger (Gatlin)
Haikyu!! (Kenshin Ukai)

2017
Natsume's Book of Friends Six (Hyakko (ep. 6))
Kirakira PreCure a la Mode (Glaive)
Kakegurui (Jun Kiwatari (ep. 4 & 5))

2018
GeGeGe no Kitarō 6th series (Wanyūdō (ep. 13))
Karakuri Circus (Shinobu Nakamachi)

2019
Fairy Gone (Biivii Risukaa)

2020
Dorohedoro (Vaux)
Haikyu!! (Kenshin Ukai)
Digimon Adventure: (Ogremon)

2021
World Trigger 2nd Season (Gatlin)

Theatrical animation
Dragon Ball Z: Super Android 13! (1992) (Android 14)
Fatal Fury: The Motion Picture (1994) (Big Bear)
Street Fighter Alpha: The Animation (1999) (Rosanov)
Dōbutsu no Mori (Animal Crossing film) (2006) (Daruman (Hopper))
Welcome to the Space Show (2010) (Rubin)

Unknown date 

Dokidoki! PreCure the Movie: Mana's Getting Married!!? The Dress of Hope Tied to the Future! (Purple Buggy)
Dragon Ball: The Path to Power (Sergeant Metallic)
Dragon Ball Z: Bojack Unbound (Bido, Tenkaichi Budokai announcer)
Dragon Ball Z: Plan to Eradicate the Saiyans (God Guardon)
Naruto the Movie: Blood Prison (Killer Bee)
Pokémon 4Ever (Ursaring)

Original net animation
7 Seeds (2019) (Dōsei Yanagi)
Super Crooks (2021) (The Salamander)

Video games

Dead or Alive (1996) (Bayman)
JoJo's Bizarre Adventure (1997) (Mohammed Avdol)
Shenmue (1999) (Charlie)

Unknown date 

Call of Duty: Modern Warfare 3 (Yuri, Japanese voice)
Dragon Ball Z: Budokai Tenkaichi 2 (Tenkaichi Budokai announcer, Freeza Soldier #2)
Dragoon Might (Kodama, Suiko, Jaoh, Dogma)
Dynasty Warriors series (Cao Ren)
Fullmetal Alchemist and the Broken Angel (Gantz Bresslau)
Fate/Extra (Lancer/Vlad III)
Fate/Grand Order (Geronimo, Vlad III 〔Extra〕)
Kaiser Knuckle (known outside Japan as Global Champion) (Gonzales)
Kessen (Sakakibara Yasumasa)
Kessen III (Takeda Katsuyori)
Langrisser I & II
Lego Batman 3: Beyond Gotham (Swamp Thing)
Mega Man Zero 3 (Tretista Kelverian)
Ninja Gaiden (Gamov)
Sakura Wars: In Hot Blood (Rasetsu)
Samurai Warriors 2 (Shimazu Yoshihiro)
Shining Force Neo (Rhinos)
Star Fox 64 (Falco Lombardi, Wolf O'Donnell, others)
Star Ocean: Till the End of Time (Shelby)
Super Smash Bros. Melee (Falco Lombardi)
Super Smash Bros. Brawl (Falco Lombardi, Little Mac)
Super Smash Bros. for Nintendo 3DS and Wii U (Falco Lombardi, Nightmare)
Tenchu: Stealth Assassins (Onikage, Japanese voice)
Time Crisis 4 (Captain Marcus Black, Lieutenant Colonel Gregory Barrows)
Tokyo Afterschool Summoners (Aegir)
Super Smash Bros Ultimate (Nightmare)

Tokusatsu
 Gridman the Hyper Agent (1993) (Rebirth Shinobilar (ep. 15) (Normal Voice by Nobuhiko Kazama), Kung Fu Shinobilar (ep. 29)
 Ninja Sentai Kakuranger (1994) (Daimaou's younger Daidarabotchi (ep. 50)
 Juukou B-Fighter (1995) (Ikari-Bomber (ep. 11), Ikari-Bomber II (ep. 27)
 Gekisou Sentai Carranger (1996) (VV Goriin (ep. 23)
 B-Fighter Kabuto (1996) (Fang Tiger Beast Dorafire (ep. 16)
 B-Robo Kabutack (1997) (Ganiran)
 Kyuukyuu Sentai GoGo-V (1999) (Bomb Psyma Beast Gasguile (ep. 3)
 Hyakujuu Sentai Gaoranger (Wedding Dress Org (ep. 6)
 Tokusou Sentai Dekaranger (2004) (Cristonian Ferley (ep. 14)
 Mahou Sentai Magiranger (Victory General Branken (eps 1–18)
 Ultraman Mebius (Roberga (ep. 31), Glozam (ep. 43, 46)
 Engine Sentai Go-onger (Engine Bus-on)
Engine Sentai Go-onger: Boom Boom! Bang Bang! GekijōBang!! (Engine Bus-on)
Engine Sentai Go-onger vs. Gekiranger (Engine Bus-on) 
Samurai Sentai Shinkenger vs. Go-onger: GinmakuBang!! (Engine Bus-on)
 Tensou Sentai Goseiger (Bari-Boru-Dara of the Uniberus Headder (ep. 47)
 Kaizoku Sentai Gokaiger (Engine Bus-on (ep. 35–36)
 Tokumei Sentai Go-Busters (Bulldozerloid (ep. 36)
 Ressha Sentai ToQger (Bag Shadow (ep. 1)
 Doubutsu Sentai Zyuohger (Prisonable (ep. 21)
 Uchuu Sentai Kyuranger (Yuterujan (ep. 14)
 Kaitou Sentai Lupinranger VS Keisatsu Sentai Patranger (Limon Gaolfang (ep. 23–25)
Kamen Rider Zi-O (Kikai Driver (ep. 23–24)

Dubbing roles

Live-action
Dominic Purcell
Prison Break (Lincoln Burrows)
The Gravedancers (Harris McKay)
Vikingdom (Eirick)
Assault on Wall Street (Jim Baxford)
Breakout (Tommy Baxter)
In the Name of the King III (Hazen Kaine)
A Fighting Man (Sailor O'Connor)
The Flash (Mick Rory/Heat Wave)
Turkey Shoot (Cmdr Rick Tyler)
Gridlocked (David Hendrix)
Isolation (Max)
Legends of Tomorrow (Mick Rory / Heat Wave / Chronos)
Crisis on Earth-X (Mick Rory / Heat Wave)
Dave Legeno
Harry Potter and the Half-Blood Prince (Fenrir Greyback)
Harry Potter and the Deathly Hallows – Part 1 (Fenrir Greyback)
Harry Potter and the Deathly Hallows – Part 2 (Fenrir Greyback)
10,000 BC (2011 TV Asahi edition) (Nakudu (Joel Virgel))
12 Strong (General Abdul Rashid Dostum (Navid Negahban))
2 Fast 2 Furious (Tej Parker (Ludacris))
American Gangster (Leroy Nicholas "Nicky" Barnes (Cuba Gooding Jr.))
Armored (Baines (Laurence Fishburne))
Babylon 5 (Doctor Stephen Franklin (Richard Biggs))
Belly of the Beast (General Jantapan (Tom Wu))
Blue Steel (1993 Fuji TV edition) (Robber (Tom Sizemore))
Casino Royale (Steven Obanno (Isaach De Bankolé))
Chappie (Amerika (Jose Pablo Cantillo))
The Constant Gardener (Arnold Bluhm (Hubert Koundé))
Die Hard with a Vengeance (Otto (Richard E. Council))
The Fundamentals of Caring (Cash (Bobby Cannavale))
Ghostbusters: Afterlife (Sherman Domingo (Bokeem Woodbine))
Hidden Figures (Jim Johnson (Mahershala Ali))
Home of the Brave (Specialist Jamal Aiken (Curtis Jackson))
Inception (2012 TV Asahi edition) (Yusuf (Dileep Rao))
Just Mercy (Walter McMillian (Jamie Foxx))
Last Light (2009 DVD edition) (Fred Whitmore (Forest Whitaker))
Léon: The Professional (Benny (Keith A. Glascoe), Tonto (Lucius Wyatt Cherokee))
Magic Mike XXL (Tarzan (Kevin Nash)
The Mentalist (Wayne Rigsby (Owain Yeoman))
Notorious (Christopher Wallace / The Notorious B.I.G. (Jamal Woolard))
Ocean's Twelve (2007 NTV edition) (Roman Nagel (Eddie Izzard))
Predators (Mombasa (Mahershala Ali))
Resident Evil: Extinction (Lloyd Jefferson Wade (Mike Epps))
Secret in Their Eyes (Raymond "Ray" Kasten (Chiwetel Ejiofor))
She-Wolf of London (Male Student 3)
Suicide Squad (George "Digger" Harkness / Captain Boomerang (Jai Courtney))
The Suicide Squad (George "Digger" Harkness / Captain Boomerang (Jai Courtney))
Transformers: Revenge of the Fallen (Sideswipe)
Transformers: Dark of the Moon (Sideswipe)
True Romance (Don 'Big Don' (Samuel L. Jackson))
X-Men Origins: Wolverine (John Wraith (will.i.am))

Animation
Batman: The Brave and the Bold (Despero)
Happy Feet Two (Seymour)
Planet Hulk (Hulk)
Meet the Robinsons (Coach)
Shrek the Third (Merlin)
Shrek Forever After (Jamie)
Surf's Up 2: WaveMania (J.C.)
Thomas the Tank Engine and Friends (Diesel (Season 6), Derek, S.C.Ruffey, Cranky (Season 5-8), Jem Cole (Season 5))

References

External links
 Hisao Egawa at GamePlaza Haruka Voice Actor Database 
 

1962 births
Living people
Japanese male video game actors
Japanese male voice actors
Male voice actors from Tokyo
20th-century Japanese male actors
21st-century Japanese male actors
Aoni Production voice actors